Haley Batten (born September 19, 1998) is an American cross-country and mountain bike cyclist.

From Park City, Utah, Batten studied at Quest University, Canada.  Batten won national titles as a junior and another at U23 level, and won a U23 World Cup, and was part of the USA team relay at the 2019 UCI Mountain Bike World Championships where they earned a silver medal in Mont-Sainte-Anne, Canada.
Batten rode for the Clif Pro Team from 2016 to 2019 and Specialized Racing for 2020, and Trinity Racing in 2021. Batten rode to a third-place finish at her first elite World Cup XCO race in Albstadt, Germany. On Friday 14 May 2021 Batten won the short-track cross-country MTB World Cup race in the Czech Republic. She followed this up with finishing in 2nd place at the Nové Město XCO World Cup race punching her ticket to the 2020 Tokyo Olympics as the finish met USA Cycling’s automatic criteria for making the team.

Major results

2015
 1st  Cross-country, National Junior Championships
2016
 2nd Cross-country, National Junior Championships
2017
 1st  Cross-country, National Under-23 Championships
2018
 2nd Cross-country, National Under-23 Championships
2019
 Pan American Championships
1st  Under-23 Cross-country
2nd  Team relay
 2nd  Team relay, UCI World Championships
2020
 1st  Cross-country, National Under-23 Championships
 UCI Under-23 XCO World Cup
3rd Nové Město I
2021
 UCI XCO World Cup
2nd Nové Město
3rd Albstadt
2022
 1st  Overall Cape Epic (with Sofía Gómez Villafañe)
 UCI World Championships
3rd  Cross-country
3rd  Team relay
 UCI XCO World Cup
3rd Mont-Sainte-Anne
2023
 Shimano Super Cup Massi
1st Banyoles

References

1998 births
Living people
American female cyclists
Sportspeople from Utah
UCI Mountain Bike World Champions (women)
Cross-country mountain bikers
Cyclists at the 2020 Summer Olympics
Olympic cyclists of the United States
21st-century American women
Cyclists from Utah